In some rodents, the alisphenoid strut is an extension of the alisphenoid bone that separates two foramina in the skull, the masticatory–buccinator foramen and the foramen ovale accessorium. The presence or absence of this strut is variable between species, but also within them; some Oryzomyini even have a strut on one side of the skull but lack it on the other side.

References

Literature cited
Weksler, M. 2006. Phylogenetic relationships of oryzomyine rodents (Muroidea: Sigmodontinae): separate and combined analyses of morphological and molecular data. Bulletin of the American Museum of Natural History 296:1–149.
Rodent anatomy